The rue de Montmorency is a street in the historic Le Marais quarter of Paris, part of the city's 3rd arrondissement. It runs from the rue du Temple to the rue Saint-Martin.

History
Named in 1768 after the Montmorency family, prominent residents of Le Marais during the Renaissance period. The Montmorency family is one of the oldest and most distinguished families in France, derived from the city of Montmorency, now in the Val-d'Oise département, about 9 miles (15 km) northwest of Paris. As the Montmorency was a noble family, the street lost its name at the French Revolution. Therefore, it was known between the end of the French Revolution and 1806 as the rue de la Réunion.

Buildings of note

Rue de Montmorency is fairly representative of the ancient streets of the heart of Paris.

No. 5, stood a mansion where Mary Magdalene of Castile and Nicolas Fouquet lived from 1651 to 1658. She brought a dowry to this vast parish located in Saint-Nicolas-des-Champs, at the corner of future streets Michel-le-Comte, the Temple, and Montmorency. The mansion belonged until 1624 to the Montmorency family. Nicolas Fouquet was nominated by Anne of Austria Superintendent of Finance in 1653. Theophile de Viau also lived there. A magnificent neoclassical fountain is still visible in the garden of the current hotel Thiroux Lailly.

No. 6, porch Louis Philippe. From 1966 to 2006 the Morder (Bernard, Hela) and their two sons (Joseph, Robi) lived there. The director Joseph Morder, considered the "Pope of the Super 8" is shot almost at least one scene in his films - from the grocer (which shows the end of a Parisian grocery store kept by an old Jewish couple who have been working there before the war) until the one on his mother, Queen of Trinidad. When she moved in late 2006 he exchanged correspondence with Alain Cavalier filmed. At the same number also lived and worked the Iranian painter Zohreh Eskandari from 2000 to 2005, as well as the French singer Lio.

No. 8, rue Madame de Sévigné lived from 1676 to 1677.

No. 10 stood a print shop, "La ruche ouvrière" (The working hive), founded after the Second World War by Yervant Aprahamiantz (born about 1900 and died in 1972) which had close relationship with the libertarian Spanish, Bulgarian, Italian, French, Russian and more particularly with Nestor Makhno-Volin. This print shop which he managed took the form of a workers' cooperative. Many leaflets, posters, newspapers, pamphlets and books published by the libertarian French, Bulgarian and Spanish were printed there. A fire destroyed the building in 1980, which was subsequently rebuilt.

No. 44 Henry Segal lived here. He died in Slovakia on August 9th, 1948 close to village Kozelnik working as volunteer on Youth Railway Construction Project. Project was run by Czechoslovak government to build railway from Hronska Dubrava to Banska Stiavnica.

No. 51, stands the house of Nicolas Flamel.

House of Nicolas Flamel

The house of Nicolas Flamel, at No. 52, which was built in 1407 by Nicolas Flamel himself still stands, the oldest stone house in Paris, at 51 rue de Montmorency; the ground floor, always a tavern, currently houses the Auberge Nicolas Flamel.  Nicolas Flamel, a scrivener and manuscript-seller who developed a reputation as an alchemist, claimed that he made the Philosopher's Stone which turns lead into gold, and that he and his wife Pernelle achieved immortality. Engraved images were discovered during recent works on this house.

On the facade of the building you can still read this inscription: "Nous homes et femes laboureurs demourans ou porche de ceste maison qui fut faite en l'an de grâce mil quatre cens et sept somes tenus chascun en droit soy dire tous les jours une paternostre et un ave maria en priant Dieu que sa grâce face pardon aus povres pescheurs trespasses Amen".

This religious foundation included a gable wall that has since disappeared. The first two floors and still retain their original decoration: the famous Gothic inscription mentioned above, as well as the pillars of the base moldings and decorations of angels and columns. On the second and fifth pillars are engraved with the initials N and F in homage to the founder of the place. This decoration appears to be the work of a Tombia cemetery near Saint-Nicolas des Champs.

This house has been the subject of new restorations in June 2007 and is now a restaurant.

Geographic situation 

The street is close to the Conservatoire National des Arts et Métiers housed in the medieval priory of Saint-Martin-des-Champs. It is also located very close to the Centre Georges Pompidou (also named Beaubourg Museum). Numerous modern art galleries can be found on Rue de Montmorency.

Trivia 

The novel Rhum from the French writer Blaise Cendrars takes place in a brick foundry located at 14 rue de Montmorency.

Places and monuments
 Place des Vosges
 Musée Picasso
 Centre Georges Pompidou
 Nicolas Flamel
 Conservatoire National des Arts et Métiers

References

Montmorency, Rue de